Patricia Olano (born 24 August 1950) is a Colombian former swimmer. She competed in five events at the 1968 Summer Olympics.

References

1950 births
Living people
Colombian female swimmers
Olympic swimmers of Colombia
Swimmers at the 1968 Summer Olympics
Sportspeople from Cali
20th-century Colombian women